Lancaster District School No. 6, also known as the Little Red Schoolhouse, is a historic school building located at Lancaster in Erie County, New York.

It was listed on the National Register of Historic Places in 2008.

References

External links
 Lancaster NY Historical Society
 Waymarking information

School buildings on the National Register of Historic Places in New York (state)
Italianate architecture in New York (state)
School buildings completed in 1868
Museums in Erie County, New York
Education museums in the United States
Historical society museums in New York (state)
National Register of Historic Places in Erie County, New York